Hindrek-Peeter Meri (21 February 1934 – 29 September 2009) was an Estonian statesman.

1957–1990, he worked at State Planning Committee of the Estonian SSR.

1990–1997, he was Auditor General of Estonia.

Personal life
His brother was Estonian writer and president Lennart Meri.

References

1934 births
2009 deaths
Estonian civil servants